Karan Arjun is a 1995 Indian Hindi-language fantasy action film directed and produced by Rakesh Roshan, starring Salman Khan, Shah Rukh Khan, Raakhee Gulzar, Kajol and Mamta Kulkarni in lead roles. Amrish Puri portrays the main antagonist, while Johnny Lever, Arjun, Jack Gaud, Ranjeet and Aasif Sheikh appear in supporting roles. The film revolves around the story of the two titular brothers who seek revenge from their greedy uncle for murdering their father, but are killed by him and are reincarnated to complete the revenge.

Karan Arjun theatrically released in India on 13 January 1995. The film received positive reviews from critics and grossed , emerging as an "all time blockbuster" and the second highest-grossing Bollywood film of 1995 after Dilwale Dulhania Le Jayenge. It was 6th highest-grossing film of the decade.

At the 41st Filmfare Awards, Karan Arjun received 10 nominations, including Best Film, Best Director (Roshan), Best Actor (Salman) and Best Supporting Actress (Raakhee), and won 2 awards – Best Editing and Best Action.

Plot 
In a village in Rajasthan, Durga Singh, a poor woman raises her two beloved sons Karan and Arjun. When Munshiji of Thakur Sangram Singh, comes to talk to Durga, she tells her husband was the Thakur's son who married her against his father's wishes. Durjan Singh, a relative of Thakur killed Durga's husband to prevent him or his family from inheriting the Thakur's estate. 

After learning that Thakur plans to sign over the estate to Karan and Arjun, Durjan kills Thakur, before brutally murdering Karan and Arjun with his brothers-in-law Nahar and Shamsher. Durga worships Goddess Kali to bring her sons back. Miraculously, Durga's prayers are heard and the two are reincarnated, but are separated and grown into different families unaware of their past lives. Durga is unaware of this miracle, but she still believes that her sons will return. 

20 years later, Arjun is reincarnated as Vijay, where he falls in love with the wealthy Sonia Saxena; she also loves him but her wedding is fixed to Durjan's son Suraj. Karan is also reborn as Ajay, who is chased upon by tomboyish girlfriend Bindiya, and soon works for Govind—Sonia's father and Durjan's partner in his illegal arms trading business. Knowing that Sonia loves Vijay, Suraj attempts to kill him, but Vijay attacks him. Ajay is sent to kill Vijay; they start to fight, that is suddenly interrupted after a bolt of lightning strikes in between them. 

Govind tries to shoot Vijay, but Ajay stops him whilst shouting for Vijay to run, which leads something that Ajay said to Vijay in their past when he was attacked. Ajay is prisoned, while Vijay escapes. Sonia is forcibly taken to Durjan's house to marry Suraj. Vijay and his friend Linghaiyya travel to save Sonia, where everybody is stunned and calls him Arjun. He finally remembers his past life and reunites with Durga, where he gets to know about his brother Karan, who is now Ajay. Vijay saves Ajay and explains the whole situation that they were brothers named Karan and Arjun. 

Meanwhile, Bindiya joins them, and Durjan hears about Karan and Arjun's return, but refuses to believe it. Nahar and Shamsher attempt to bring them before him but instead get killed by Ajay and Vijay in a similar way as they killed the two brothers. Karan (Ajay) and Arjun (Vijay) frighten Durjan by convincing that they're back. Govind and Durjan have a falling out, in which Govind tells Sonia to run away with Vijay, but it's actually a trap. 

Ajay succeeds in creating chaos, letting Vijay and Sonia escape from the trap. Vijay shoots Suraj to death, and Durjan kills Govind in a fit of rage. He attempts to shoot Ajay and Vijay but instead they beat him up. He begs forgiveness from Durga, but Ajay and Vijay take their revenge by killing him on her order. Later, Vijay marries Sonia, Ajay marries Bindiya, and the whole family is united.

Cast 

Salman Khan as Karan Singh / Ajay (dual role)
 Shah Rukh Khan as Arjun Singh / Vijay (dual role)
 Raakhee as Durga Singh
 Kajol as Sonia Saxena
 Mamta Kulkarni as Bindiya
 Amrish Puri as Thakur Durjan Singh, the main antagonist
 Johnny Lever as Linghaiyya Tripuri, Vijay's best friend
 Ranjeet as Mr. Govind Saxena, Sonia's father and Durjan's crime partner
 Aasif Sheikh as Suraj Singh, Sonia's former fiancé and Durjan's son
 Ashok Saraf as Badal Munshi a.k.a. Munshiji
 Jack Gaud as Shamsher Singh, Durjan's brother-in-law
 Arjun as Nahar Singh, Durjan's brother-in-law
 Gavin Packard as Surakwal Rishmore, the fighter with red pants
 Ila Arun in "Gup Chup" song as Sunehrika Kalwani, Rajasthani Dancer
 Kishore Bhanushali as Zakir Sahmed, Bindiya's lover
 Suresh Chatwal as Girdhari Singhania, Ajay's alcoholic father
 Salim Khan Ding-Dong as Fight Organiser
 John Gabriel as Peter
 Dinesh Hingoo as Peston
 Raj Kishore as Jugal
 Anil Nagrath as Fight Organiser
 Ghanshyam Rohera as Ashu Bakshi
 Babbanlal Yadav as Deepak Shukla
 Vasanthi (special appearance)

Production

Casting 
Rakesh Roshan originally wanted to make the film with Ajay Devgn and Shah Rukh Khan as the titular characters. However, both wanted to play different roles to the ones offered to them; Khan wanted to play Karan, while Devgn wanted to play Arjun. Roshan did not agree, and, as a result, both backed out of the film. Roshan's next choices for the leads were Aamir Khan and Salman Khan. While Salman agreed to do the film, Aamir could not do it. Shah Rukh then told Roshan that he wanted to do the film. Thus, the casting of the film brought together Salman Khan and Shah Rukh Khan for the first time onscreen, two prominent actors of that time.

Hrithik Roshan assisted his father during this film, having assisted him in his previous movies.

Filming 
The whole film was shot in Rajasthan. More specifically, the village which is portrayed in the film is one of the villages of Alwar District of Rajasthan, named Bhangarh. The Durga temple where Karan Arjun pray in the song is located at Pushkar near Ajmer. Sariska Palace was used as Thakur Durjan Singh's house.

Box office 
Karan Arjun was the second-highest-grossing Indian film of 1995, only surpassed by Dilwale Dulhania Le Jayenge, which also starred Shah Rukh Khan, Kajol and Amrish Puri. Worldwide, Karan Arjun grossed . Overseas, the film grossed $500,000.

Home Media 
The film has also been released on VHD, VCD and DVD formats for home media. It has not seen a release on Blu-ray Disc or subsequent media formats, apart from YouTube.

Awards 
41st Filmfare Awards:

1996 Screen Awards:

Music 
The music and background score were composed by Rajesh Roshan and lyrics for all the songs were penned by Indeevar. The music rights were originally bought by Time Magnetics (now Tips Music). The song "Bhangra Paale" was remade for the 2020 film Bhangra Paa Le.

Additionally, the themes from The Terminator 2 and The Last of the Mohicans were featured throughout the film, especially during fight & jail scenes.

Notes

References

External links 
 

1990s fantasy action films
1990s Hindi-language films
1995 action films
1995 fantasy films
1995 films
Films about reincarnation
Films directed by Rakesh Roshan
Films scored by Rajesh Roshan
Films with screenplays by Sachin Bhowmick
Indian fantasy action films
1990s masala films